D533 was a state road that connected the city of Šibenik and A1 motorway in Šibenik interchange to D33 state road. The part of the road between Šibenik and A1 motorway was opened on June 26, 2005 while the part between A1 motorway and D33 state road was opened in 2007. The road was abolished and merged with D33 in 2012. The road was 8.0 km long.

All D533 road junctions except for its northern terminus (north of A1) were grade separated. The D533 was executed as a single-carriageway, two-lane expressway with a speed limit of 80 km/h (50 mph).

The road, as well as all other state roads in Croatia, was managed and maintained by Hrvatske ceste, state owned company.

Traffic volume 

Traffic was regularly counted and reported by Hrvatske ceste, operator of the road. Substantial variations between annual (AADT) and summer (ASDT) traffic volumes are attributed to the fact that the road served as a connection of the city of Šibenik and several tourist resorts to the Croatian motorway network.

Road junctions and populated areas

Sources

See also
 State roads in Croatia
 Hrvatske ceste
Transport in Šibenik-Knin County